Thomas de Vere Hunt (born 19 January 1931), generally known as Pat Hunt, is a former New Zealand politician of the National Party.

Biography

Hunt was born in Auckland in 1931. He gained his education at Mount Albert Grammar School and the University of Auckland, from where he graduated with a BEng.

In  Hunt replaced Gavin Downie as the National candidate for Pakuranga, in a controversial challenge to a sitting MP. Downie stood as an Independent and the previous substantial majority was reduced, but Hunt was elected in 1978. Hunt narrowly held onto the electorate in  when he was challenged by Neil Morrison of the Social Credit Party.

During the 1984 election campaign, Hunt coined the unflattering term "Skoda brigade and Crimplene suit contingent" for Social Credit supporters. The Skoda company were angered by the remark and it became an epitaph to Hunt who later tried to be selected as a National candidate again, though his attempts were rebuffed. Hunt later joined ACT New Zealand instead where he found himself together with Morrison who had joined the party too. When appearing together at the inaugural ACT conference in 1994 Morrison acknowledged that many Social Creditors liked crimplene and one of his branch members drove a Skoda.

In 1990, Hunt was awarded the New Zealand 1990 Commemoration Medal.

References

1931 births
Living people
New Zealand National Party MPs
Members of the New Zealand House of Representatives
New Zealand MPs for Auckland electorates
Unsuccessful candidates in the 1984 New Zealand general election
ACT New Zealand politicians